Wet Willie is an American band from Mobile, Alabama. Their best-known song, "Keep On Smilin'", reached No. 10 on the U.S. Billboard Hot 100 chart in August 1974. Several other of the group's songs also appeared on the singles charts in the 1970s, which utilized their soulful brand of Southern rock.

History
Drummer Lewis Ross assembled the musicians for a group called "Fox" in the summer of 1969, and after relocating from Mobile, Alabama to Macon, Georgia, home of Capricorn Records, became known as "Wet Willie" in 1970. The band made its name playing Southern rock from 1971 until 1979, producing a number of albums and several charting singles, one of them  achieving Top Ten success. They first became known to concertgoers as the opening act for the Allman Brothers Band in 1971, and still perform today. When Jimmy Hall is with the band, it is billed as Wet Willie, otherwise as The Wet Willie Band.

Band members
The core members of the band during that period were Jimmy Hall, vocals, harmonica, saxophone; Jimmy's brother Jack Hall on bass; John David Anthony on keyboards; Ricky Hirsch on guitar, and Lewis Ross on drums and percussion. Wick Larsen was added as a second guitarist for a brief stay during the Wet Willie II album period. The duo of women singing background vocals dubbed "The Williettes" were a staple of the classic Wet Willie sound that featured Jimmy and Jack's sister, Donna Hall, and Ella Brown Avery. For a short period of time in 1974, the British singer Elkie Brooks joined the band as a backing singer, as did future Honkette Leslie Hawkins. Michael Duke debuted on the album Dixie Rock adding keyboards and vocals, and stayed with the band through their tenure in the Southern rock era. A period of personnel and record label changes followed and in 1978 with a new Epic Records contract the new line-up included Jimmy and Jack Hall, Mike Duke, drummer T.K. Lively, and guitarists Marshall Smith and Larry Berwald through 1980. After a brief hiatus the band regrouped in 1990 featuring the siblings Jimmy, Jack and Donna Hall, along with original keyboardist John David Anthony, drummer T.K. Lively and long-time members guitarists Ric Seymour and Ricky Chancey.

Recordings
Wet Willie put out several albums on Capricorn Records between 1971 and 1977. Along with a "Greatest Hits" album released on Polydor Records, they also released two more final studio albums on Epic Records, although some hits collections and further live recordings have been released as recently as 2006. Perhaps their best-known LP is the 1973 live album, Drippin' Wet, but their main claim to fame is the hit single, "Keep On Smilin,'" which reached No. 10 on the Billboard Hot 100. They also enjoyed some other Billboard charting singles with "Country Side of Life," "Everything That 'Cha Do (Will Come Back to You)", "Leona," and from their Epic Records period, "Street Corner Serenade" and "Weekend" from the LPs Manorisms and Which One's Willie?

Reviewing the 1977 Greatest Hits LP in Christgau's Record Guide: Rock Albums of the Seventies (1981), Robert Christgau wrote: "Alone among Southern boogiemen, the Willies have avoided country as in c&w for country as in funk, and their rhythm section gets away with it—drummer Lewis Ross and bass player Jack Hall are all juke-joint bump-and-grind. In a better world they'd be rednecks in a soul band, but as it is they're stuck in a group with two problems—singer and songs. (Oops, forgot the guitarist, which isn't hard.) Jimmy Hall supposedly combines Ronnie Van Zant's discretion with Gregg Allman's power, but to me he sounds like a cross between Chris Youlden and Lonesome Dave Peverett—with an authentic accent, of course. And although their one lucky strike has been the reggaeish 'Keep On Smilin',' most of the time they strive fruitlessly for R&B tunes as inescapably elementary as the here-included 'Shout Bamalama' and 'Grits Ain't Groceries.' I guarantee you that Little Milton isn't going to return the favor and cover 'Leona' or even 'Baby Fat.' But maybe Stoney Edwards would do 'Airport.'"

Current formations
In 2012, Wet Willie released a new live CD Miles of Smiles on the Hittin' The Note Records label. They continue to tour with three original members including original lead singer Jimmy Hall, brother Jack Hall on bass and vocals, sister Donna Hall Foster on vocals, as well as other long time members, drummer T.K. Lively, Ric Seymour on guitar and vocals, Ricky Chancey on guitar and newest member, keyboardist Bobby Mobley.

Achievements
 America’s Music Award from the Alabama Hall of Fame - 1976
 Inducted into the Georgia Music Hall of Fame - 2014

Discography

Studio albums

Live albums

Compilation albums

Source: Allmusic.com

Singles

References

External links
The Official Wet Willie Homepage
Wet Willie Discography
Official Jimmy Hall

Rock music groups from Alabama
Jam bands
Epic Records artists
American funk musical groups
Musical groups established in 1970
American southern rock musical groups
Capricorn Records artists
Sibling musical groups